List of metro stations in Warsaw is list of existing and planned stations of the underground railway system in Warsaw. Since 4 April 2020, the system has consisted of 2 lines and 34 stations. It connects the city centre with Bielany, Praga-Północ, Targówek, Wola, Mokotów, Ursynów and Żoliborz. Upon completion, the M2 line will also run through Bemowo, and its branch, called the M3 line, will run through Praga-Południe. The Metro is managed by Metro Warszawskie.

Current stations

Future stations

References

External links 
 
 Warsaw at UrbanRail.net
 Warsaw Metro Map
 Warsaw Metro fan site and discussion forum 
 pictures of Warsaw Metro 
 Stations as Canvas: Painting the Warsaw Metro

Warsaw Metro
 
Warsaw Metro stations
Warsaw Metro
Metro stations